Leon Manteuffel-Szoege (born 5 May 1904 in Rzeżyca, d. 1973 in Warsaw) was a Polish surgeon.

His brothers were Tadeusz Manteuffel and Edward Manteuffel-Szoege. He graduated from the Warsaw University under the supervision of Zygmunt Radliński. During the II World War he worked in conspiracy under the pseudonym "Krab" (literally Crab). For the whole German occupation he worked in clinic. Manteuffel-Szoege was one of three physicians who survived the Wola massacre.

Publications 
 Reflections on the mechanical function of the heart, Manteuffel-Szoege L., Kardiol. Pol. 1973;16(5):391-8 (pl), 
 Some hemodynamic problems of extracorporeal circulation perfusion in relation to the hemodynamics of physiological circulation, Manteuffel-Szoege L., Kardiol Pol. 1973;16(5):385–90 (pl), 
 Paradoxes of hemodynamics (II), Manteuffel-Szoege L., Kardiol. Pol. 1971;14(1):39–48 (pl) 
 Paradoxes in hemodynamics (I), Manteuffel-Szoege L., Kardiol. Pol. 1971;14(1):33–8 (pl) 
 The Chalubiński legend? Manteuffel-Szoege L., Arch. Hist. Med. (Warszawa). 1971;34(1):33–9 (pl), 
 Mitral commissurotomy. Results in 1700 cases, Manteuffel-Szoege L., Nowicki J, Wasniewska M, Sitkowski W, Turski C., J. Cardiovasc. Surg. (Torino), 1970 Sep-Oct;11(5):350–4, 
 In memoriam: Docent Dr. med. Zbigniew Woźniewski (1914–1969), Manteuffel-Szoege L., Gruźlica 1970 Sep;38(9):945–9 (pl), 
 Morphology of blood flow in blood vessels. Preliminary report, Manteuffel-Szoege L., Pol. Med. J. 1970;9(2):315–21, 
 Zbigniew Woźniewski (1914–1969), Manteuffel-Szoege L., Arch. Hist. Med. (Warszawa), 1970;33(2):247–60, Polish. 
 Professor dr med. Stefania Chodkowska (4.8.1897–16.9.1969), Manteuffel-Szoege L., Gruźlica, 1970;38(8):860–3 (pl), 
 Morphology of the blood flowin the blood vessels. First research results, Manteuffel-Szoege L., Thoraxchir. Vask. Chir. 1969 Dec;17(6):557–63 (de), 
 Morphology of blood circulation in blood vessels. Preliminary studies, Manteuffel-Szoege L., Pol. Arch. Med. Wewn. 1969 Jun;42(6):845–52 (pl), 
 Remarks on blood flow. (The problem of the specific haemodynamic properties of blood, Manteuffel-Szoege L., J Cardiovasc Surg (Torino) 1969 Jan-Feb;10(1):22–30, 
 Surgical treatment of tetralogy of fallot. Diagnosis, indications, surgery selection and results of operative treatment, Manteuffel-Szoege L., Waśniewska M., Kardiol. Pol. 1967;10(2):69–79 (pl), 
 On the possibility of blood circulation continuing after stopping the heart, Manteuffel-Szoege L., Michałowski J., Grundman J., Pacocha W., J Cardiovasc Surg (Torino). 1966 May-Jun;7(3):201–8, 
 Dr Edward Zieliński (1861–1921), Manteuffel-Szoege L., Arch. Hist. Med. (Warszawa), 1966;29(1):43–66 (pl), 
 An attempt to analyze hemodynamic changes during the use of extracorporeal circulation, Michałowski J., Manteuffel-Szoege L., Pol. Tyg. Lek. 1965 Jul 19;20(29):1094–5 (pl), 
 Paradoxical hemodynemic phenomena, Manteuffel-Szoege L., Pol. Tyg. Lek. 1965 Jun 28;20(26):948–50 (pl), 
 On mechanisms for circulatory arrest and restoration under various clinical and experimental conditions, Manteuffel-Szoege L., Pol. Przegl. Chir. 1964 Mar;36:325–33 (pl), 
 Clinical thought and clinical thinking (attempted characterization of the problem from the surgical point of view, Manteuffel-Szoege L., Pol. Przegl. Chir. 1964 Mar;36:261–6 (pl), 
 On stopping and restarting of circulation in deep hypothermia, Manteuffel-Szoege L., J. Cardiovasc Surg (Torino), 1964 Jan-Feb;5:76–80, 
 Haemodynamic disturbances in normo and hypothermia with excluded heart and during acute heart muscle failure, Manteuffel-Szoege L., J. Cardiovasc. Surg. (Torino), 1963 Aug;4:551–5, 
 The problem of blood circulation in normo- and hypothermia, Manteuffel-Szoege L., Cas. Lek. Cesk. 1962 Jun 8;101:718-21, (pl), 
 Some new aspects about the haemodynamics of deep hypothermia, Manteuffel-Szoege L., Ann. Chir. Thorac. Cardiovasc. 1962 Apr;1:571, 
 Observations On Hemodynamics In Moderate And Deep Hypothermia, Manteuffel-Szoege L., Nowicki J., Michalowski J., Grundman J., Turski C., Pacocha W., Sitkowski W., Szaginski W., Pol. Przegl. Chir. 1961 Nov;33:1273–83 (pl), 
 A new view on the hemodynamics of deep hypothermia (role and significance of the "supplementary circulatory energy factor"), Manteuffel-Szoege L., Pol. Tyg. Lek. 1961 Sep 4;16:1412–3 (pl), 
 Sources of motor energy of the blood (contribution to the problem of blood circulation in hypothermia), Manteuffel-Szoege L., Cas. Lek. Cesk. 1961 Jun 23;100:740–2 (cs), 
 Surgical therapy of aortic stenosis co-existing with mitral stenosis, Manteuffel-Szoege L., Waśniewska-Zielinska M., Pol. Tyg. Lek. 1961 Feb 27;16:321–5 (pl), 
 Clinical use of Crafoord-Senning's apparatus for extra-corporeal circulation, Nowicki J., Justyna M., Michałowski J., Sitkowski W. Jr, Serafin R., Szagiński W., Pacocha W., Turski C., Manteuffel-Szoege L., Pol. Przegl. Chir. 1961;33:1040–3 (pl), 
 Experience with heart surgery with the use of extracorporeal circulation, Sitkowski W. Jr, Justyna M., Michałowski J., Waśniewska M., Warda B., Grundman J., Nowicki J., Manteuffel-Szoege L., Pol. Przegl. Chir. 1961;33:1044–7 (pl), 
 Problem of the source of energy in blood circulation, Manteuffel-Szoege L., Pol. Przegl. Chir. 1960 Aug-Sep;32:835–45 (pl), 
 Remarks on energy sources of blood circulation, Manteuffel-Szoege L., Turski C., Grundman J., Bull. Soc. Int. Chir. 1960 Aug;19:371–4, 
 Energy sources of blood circulation and the mechanical action of the heart, Manteuffel-Szoege L., Thorax. 1960 Mar;15:47–53, 
 Influence of the lowering of temperature on blood viscosity and on the work of the circulatory system, Manteuffel-Szoege L., Sitkowski W. Jr, Maczeński S., Minerva Cardioangiol. Eur. 1959 Jul-Sep;7:256–61 (fr), 
 Manteuffel-Szoege L., Sitkowski W. Jr, Minerva Med. 1958 Jul 4;49(53):2617–20 (it), 
 Nature of mechanical functions of the heart; The heart works like a hydraulic ram, Manteuffel-Szoege L., Gonta T., Minerva Cardioangiol. 1958 Apr-Jun;4(2):261–7 (fr), 
 Essay on the clarification of mechanical function of the heart; Battering ram-like function of the heart, Manteuffel-Szoege L., Gonta T., Pol. Tyg. Lek. (Warszawa). 1957 Jul 1;12(27):1048–52 (pl), 
 Resection of the lung tissue in the treatment of pulmonary tuberculosis; Surgical technic and results, Manteuffel-Szoege L., Gruźlica 1956 Aug;24(8):775–84 (pl), 
 Colostomy of the upper stomach, Manteuffel-Szoege L., Sitkowski W., Zentralbl. Chir.1956;81(33a):1463–7 (de), 
 Plastic surgery of the upper part of the stomach with a portion of the large intestine, Manteuffel-Szoege L., Sitkowski W Jr, Pol. Tyg. Lek. (Warszawa), 1955 Dec 19;10(51):1653–5 (pl), 
 Surgical treatment of constrictive pericarditis; Ten case reports, Manteuffel-Szoege L., Waśniewska M., Kardiol. Pol. 1954;1(1-2):7–17 (pl), 
 Results of surgical treatment of diseases of esophagus and gastric cardia, Manteuffel-Szoege L., Koszarowski T., Wiechno W., Pol. Tyg. Lek. (Warszawa), 1952 Aug 25;7(33–34):1008-14, 
 100 Cases of pulmonary resection, Manteuffel-Szoege L., Koszarowski T., Justyna M., Nowicki J., Wiechno W., Gruźlica 1952 Mar-Apr;20(2):202–6, 
 Bronchial adenomas and their treatment, Manteuffel-Szoege L., Gruźlica. 1952 Jan-Feb;20(1): 37–46, 
 Mechanism of healing of tuberculous cavity, Manteuffel-Szoege L., Gruźlica. 1951, Mar-Apr;19(2):153–63, 
 Surgical diathermy in the treatment of maxillary cancer, Manteuffel-Szoege L., Koszarowski T., Pol. Tyg. Lek. (Warszawa), 1951 Feb 12;6(7):193–202, 

1904 births
1973 deaths
Baltic-German people
Polish cardiac surgeons
20th-century surgeons